Lagopodo (Greek: Λαγώποδο) is a settlement on Zakynthos island, Greece. Its population is 483 (2011 census).

References

Populated places in Zakynthos